Monte Soratte (ancient: Soracte) is a mountain ridge in the Metropolitan City of Rome, central Italy. The nearest settlement is the village of Sant'Oreste. Saint Orestes or Edistus, after whom the settlement is named, is said to have been martyred near Monte Soratte.

The ridge is part of a  Natural Reserve housing a variety of vegetation and fauna.

History and sights
The area was used by the ancient Italic peoples of the area (Sabines, Capenates, Falisci) and the Etruscan civilization for the cult of the God Soranus. Mount Soratte was mentioned by Horace ("vides ut alta stet nive candidum Soracte?" Carm. i. 9), and Virgil, who stated that Apollo was its guardian deity.

The hermitage of St. Sylvester is just below the summit. According to a legend, its church  was founded by Pope Sylvester, who had taken refuge there to escape Constantine's persecution. The church houses 14th- and 15th-century frescoes. Another four hermitages are on the ridge.

The church of Santa Maria delle Grazie was built in 1835 over a pre-existing 16th-century edifice and houses a once highly venerated image of the Madonna.

Johann Wolfgang von Goethe mentioned the peak in Italian Journey, his diary of his travels through Italy from 1786–1788. He wrote that "Soracte stands out by itself in magnificent solitude. Probably this mountain is made of limestone and belongs to the Apennines."

In his 1902 memoir The Path to Rome, Hilaire Belloc sketched the mountain in the final days of his walking pilgrimage from Toul and wrote: "It stood up like an acropolis, but it was a citadel for no city. It stood alone, like the soul that once haunted its recesses and prophesied the conquering advent of the northern kings."

During World War II, after the 8 September 1943 Frascati air raid, Field Marshal Albert Kesselring moved his headquarters from Frascati to the bunkers in Monte Soratte.

References

Soratte
World War II operations and battles of the Italian Campaign